The 2019–20 Hampton Pirates men's basketball team represented Hampton University in the 2019–20 NCAA Division I men's basketball season. The Pirates, led by 11th-year head coach Edward Joyner, Jr., played their home games at the Hampton Convocation Center in Hampton, Virginia as members of the Big South Conference. They finished the season 15–19, 8–10 in Big South play to finish in a tie for fifth place. They defeated Longwood and Radford to advance to the championship game of the Big South tournament where they lost to Winthrop.

Previous season
The Pirates finished the 2018–19 season 18–17 overall, 9–7 in Big South play, to finish in a four-way tie for fifth place. In the Big South tournament, they defeated Longwood in the first round, before falling to Campbell in the quarterfinals. They received an invitation to the CIT, they defeated St. Francis Brooklyn in the first round, Charleston Southern in the second round, NJIT in the quarterfinals, before falling to Marshall in the semifinals.

Roster

Schedule and results

|-
!colspan=12 style=| Non-conference regular season

|-
!colspan=9 style=| Big South Conference regular season

|-
!colspan=12 style=| Big South tournament
|-

|-

Source

References

Hampton Pirates men's basketball seasons
Hampton Pirates
Hampton Pirates men's basketball
Hampton Pirates men's basketball